Stéphane Messi (born 27 November 1972) is a French para table tennis player who competes in international level events. He is a Paralympic champion, a five-time World medalist and a European champion. He has won medals in team events alongside Michel Schaller, François Sérignat and Alain Pichon.

References

External links 
 
 

1972 births
Living people
Sportspeople from Agen
Sportspeople from Hyères
Paralympic table tennis players of France
Table tennis players at the 1996 Summer Paralympics
Table tennis players at the 2000 Summer Paralympics
Table tennis players at the 2004 Summer Paralympics
Table tennis players at the 2008 Summer Paralympics
Table tennis players at the 2012 Summer Paralympics
Table tennis players at the 2016 Summer Paralympics
Medalists at the 2000 Summer Paralympics
Medalists at the 2004 Summer Paralympics
Medalists at the 2008 Summer Paralympics
French male table tennis players
21st-century French people
20th-century French people